The 2019 Asian Wrestling Championships was held in Xi'an, China. The event took place from April 23 to April 28, 2019.

Medal table

Team ranking

Medal summary

Men's freestyle

Men's Greco-Roman

Women's freestyle

Participating nations 
331 competitors from 26 nations competed.

 (2)
 (30)
 (12)
 (3)
 (30)
 (20)
 (3)
 (30)
 (2)
 (30)
 (24)
 (1)
 (22)
 (9)
 (1)
 (1)
 (2)
 (7)
 (30)
 (3)
 (2)
 (14)
 (4)
 (12)
 (29)
 (8)

References

Results Book (Archived version)

External links
UWW Official Website

Asia
Asian Wrestling Championships
Wrestling
International wrestling competitions hosted by China
Asian Wrestling Championships